William John Shorrock (born 30 January 1999) is an English footballer who plays for  side Rushall Olympic, where he plays as a midfielder.

Playing career

Walsall
Shorrock made his first-team debut for Walsall as a 74th-minute substitute for Josh Ginnelly in a 2–1 victory over Sheffield United in an EFL Trophy group stage game at Bramall Lane on 4 October 2016.

He was released by Walsall at the end of the 2017–18 season.

Bromsgrove Sporting
On 25 July 2018, Shorrock joined up with Southern League Division One Central side Bromsgrove Sporting for pre-season. It was confirmed on 15 August 2018, that following some impressive displays in a pre-season game against Alvechurch, capped by goals against Stourbridge and Evesham United, Shorrock had signed for the club on a one-year deal.

Shorrock was named in the Bromsgrove Sporting retained list in preparation for the 2020–21 Southern League Premier Central season on 7 July 2020.

Rushall Olympic
On 3 June 2022, it was confirmed that Shorrock had signed for fellow Southern League Premier Central side Rushall Olympic for the 2022–23 season.

Career statistics

References

External links

1999 births
Living people
English footballers
Association football midfielders
Walsall F.C. players
Bromsgrove Sporting F.C. players
Rushall Olympic F.C. players
English Football League players
Southern Football League players